The Kentucky Governor's School for the Arts (GSA) is a three-week summer program for rising juniors and seniors in the state of Kentucky. Each spring over 1700 students audition for 256 (as of 2017) spots in the program. The program is located at the University of Kentucky in Lexington, KY. The program is free for students to attend, and most universities in the state, and several in other states, offer scholarships to GSA alumni. The 256 selected applicants are divided into nine different art forms (disciplines), which means that an average of about 28 students throughout the state are selected for each discipline, emphasizing the selectivity of the program's recruitment of prospective young artists.

ArtShops
Each fall, ArtShops are offered in several locations across the state. Begun in 1997, these ArtShops typically take the form of masterclasses for each of the disciplines.

See also
Kentucky Governor's Scholars Program

Education in Kentucky
Gifted education